The Fisher R-80 Tiger Moth is a Canadian two-seat, conventional landing gear, single engined, biplane kit aircraft designed for construction by amateur builders. The designation indicates that the aircraft is 80% the size of the aircraft that inspired it, the de Havilland Tiger Moth. Fisher Flying Products was originally based in Edgeley, North Dakota, USA but the company is now located in Woodbridge, Ontario, Canada.

Development
The R-80 was designed by Fisher Aircraft in the United States in 1994 and was intended to comply with the US Experimental - Amateur-built category, although it qualifies as an ultralight aircraft in some countries, such as Canada. It also qualifies as a US Experimental Light Sport Aircraft.

The construction of the R-80 is of wood, with the wings, tail and fuselage covered with doped aircraft fabric. The aircraft features interplane struts and cabane struts. Like the original Tiger Moth, the R-80 has no flaps. The R-80's main landing gear is bungee suspended. Cockpit access is via the lower wing. The company claims an amateur builder would need 600 hours to build the R-80.

Specified engines for the R-80 version have included the  Geo Tracker auto-conversion engine and the  Norton AE 100R rotary engine.

By late 2011 more than 24 R-80s were flying.

In 2000 Fisher introduced a welded 4130 steel tube fuselage as an alternative to the standard wooden fuselage. The steel fuselage version was known as the RS-80. Six RS-80s had been completed by the end of 2004. Since the company moved to Canada, the RS-80 option is no longer available.

In reviewing the R-80 Ben Millspaugh wrote in Kitplanes Magazine:

Operational history
In 2000 African Flying Adventures purchased four RS-80 kits to be used for tourist flying in Zimbabwe.

Variants
R-80
Original version with wooden fuselage
RS-80
Version with welded 4130 steel tube fuselage, introduced in 2000 and discontinued 2008.

Aircraft on display
NX34TM Tillamook Air Museum, Tillamook, Oregon/

Specifications (R-80)

Notable appearances in media
In 2015, an R-80 Tiger Moth built by Jerry Boughner was featured in the Taylor Swift video Wildest Dreams.

See also

References

External links

Official website
Photo of an R-80
Photo of an RS-80

1990s Canadian ultralight aircraft
Light-sport aircraft
Aircraft first flown in 1994
Biplanes
Single-engined tractor aircraft